Haim Be'er (Hebrew: חיים באר), born on 9 February 1945, is an Israeli novelist.

Biography
Haim Rachlevsky (Be'er) was born in Jerusalem to an Orthodox Jewish family. He grew up in the Geula neighborhood, and attended Ma'aleh, a state religious high school. In 1963–1965 he served in the Israel Defense Forces in the army rabbinate, writing for the army newspaper Mahanayim. Concurrently he worked nights as a copy editor at the daily newspaper Davar.

In 1966, he began working at the Am Oved publishing house, first as a copyeditor and later as an editor and member of the editorial board. All his books have been published by Am Oved. For ten years, he wrote a weekly column called "Memoirs of a Bookworm" (Mi-zikhronoteha shel tolaat sefarim).

Be'er teaches Hebrew literature at Ben-Gurion University of the Negev.

Be'er's latest novel, El Makom Sheharuakh Holekh, ("Back from Heavenly Lake"; 2010), was inspired by a trek to Nepal and Tibet. Dedicated to the classic Yiddish writer Mendele Mocher Sforim, it is a mystical tale about a Hasidic rebbe from Bnei Brak who travels to Tibet.

Published works
Sha`ashu`ei Yom Yom (Day to Day Delights, poems, 1970)
Feathers (in English translation, 2004), originally Notzot (1979)
Et ha-Zamir (The Time of Trimming, 1987)
Gam Ahavatam Gam Sinatam - Bialik, Brenner, Agnon Ma`arakhot Yahasim (Their Love and Their Hate: Bialik, Brenner, Agnon, Relationships, biography, 1993)
The Pure Element of Time (in English translation, 2003), originally Havalim (1998)
Lifnei Hamakom ("Upon a Certain Place") (2007)

Awards (selection)
Prime Minister's Prize for Hebrew Literary Works, for poetry (1979)
Bernstein Prize, original Hebrew novel category (1980)
 for literature, awarded by the Municipality of Holon (2000)
Bialik Prize for literature, jointly with Maya Bejerano, Yoel Hoffman and Miriam Rut (2002)

See also
List of Bialik Prize recipients

References

External links
"Haim Be`er" at the Institute for Translation of Hebrew Literature. Retrieved November 23, 2005.
Analysis of Be'er's literary style, Arnold Band - https://web.archive.org/web/20041019113219/http://www.ithl.org.il/interview1.html

Bernstein Prize recipients
1945 births
Living people
Israeli novelists
Recipients of Prime Minister's Prize for Hebrew Literary Works